Nestotus is a genus of flowering plants in the family Asteraceae.

The name Nestotus was chosen because it is an anagram of the name of the related genus Stenotus. Tonestus is similarly another anagram of the same name.

 Species
 Nestotus macleanii (Brandegee) R.P.Roberts, Urbatsch & Neubig - Yukon Territory
 Nestotus stenophyllus (A.Gray) R.P.Roberts, Urbatsch & Neubig - California, Nevada, Oregon, Idaho, Washington

References

Astereae
Asteraceae genera
Flora of North America